Titti Sigrid Renée Eliasson Sjöblom (born 29 August 1949) is a Swedish pop singer. She is the daughter of singer Alice Babs and director Nils Ivar Sjöblom. She participated at Melodifestivalen 1974 with the song "Fröken Ur-sång", ending up in fourth place. Her first dinner shows and folk park tours with Charlie Norman took place during the mid-1970s.

Discography 
Sjung med oss, mamma. Alice Babs, Titti och Torsten Tegnér sjunger Alice Tegnér. recorded 1963 
Titti Sjöblom special. 1989
All of us. The Butlers med refrängsångerskan Titti Sjöblom. 1992
Får jag lov ... eller ska vi dansa först with Arne Domnérus orkester. Vocalist at four songs. 1994
För själ och hjärta med Ehrling Eliasson. 1999
Tittis bästa. Compilation album 2003
Sjung med oss mamma. Vol. 2. Toner i fyra generationer with Alice Babs, Ehrling Eliasson, Nils & Dennis Breitholtz. 2003
Världsarvets serenad. Hyllning till Höga Kusten with Ehrling Eliasson. 2006
Titti & Ehrling sjunger Kai Gullmar with Ehrling Eliasson. 2008

Citations

External links 

 

1949 births
Living people
Melodifestivalen contestants
Singers from Stockholm
20th-century Swedish women singers
21st-century Swedish women singers